Mathilde Sternat is a French cellist and arranger.

Life 
Sternat studied the cello and chamber music, notably with Étienne Péclard, at the Conservatoire de Paris and won her prize in 1995. Since then, she has been playing chamber music in small ensembles and in different chamber orchestras (Camerata Salzburg, Chamber Orchestra of Europe) and as soloist of several symphony orchestras (the Orchestre philharmonique de Montpellier, the Orchestre symphonique de Tours, the Orchestre lyrique de Tours).

As a member of the Travelling Quartet —  Anne Gravoin and David Braccini (violins), Vincent Pasquier (double bass) and Mathilde Sternat — she makes arrangements of the repertoire of the art music of the 19th and early 20th centuries (Tchaikovsky, Brahms, Offenbach, Satie, among others) and arrangements of compositions of Jazz (Scott Joplin, Bill Evans, George Gershwin, Astor Piazzolla, notably) pop music (The Beatles…), film scores and French songs (Édith Piaf, Jacques Brel, Charles Aznavour, among others).

In addition to her engagements mainly for chamber music, Sternat composes and arranges music for theatre performances and regularly performs in concert and recording studio with mainly French musicians, but also internationally known musicians, such as Malia, Patrick Bruel, Laurent Voulzy, Michel Sardou, Nolwenn Leroy and Sofia Mestari.

Recordings (selection) 
 Luigi Boccherini, Quintets with flute [G.437-442] - with Jean-Pierre Rampal, Régis Pasquier, Bruno Pasquier and Roland Pidoux (1997, Sony SK 62 679) 
 Eleftheria Arvanitaki, Diffusion (2001, Emarcy Records/Universal)
 Jacques Loussier Trio, Mozart, Concertos pour piano 20 & 23 (2005, Telarc)
 Nolwenn Leroy, Histoires Naturelles (2006, Mercury/Universal)

References

External links 

 Mathilde Sternat
 Discography (Discogs)
 Web site of the Travelling Quartet

Year of birth missing (living people)
Living people
Conservatoire de Paris alumni
French women classical cellists
Women cellists
21st-century French musicians
21st-century French women musicians
21st-century cellists